Heartless Moon is an album by American singer-songwriter Brendan Gamble.  It was released on September 24, 2002, on Mud Records.

Track listing 
All tracks written by Brendan Gamble.
 Heartless Moon – 6:01
 Lion's Share – 2:49
 Skipping Rocks – 3:12
 Looking for Margrett – 3:56
 I Don't Need December – 3:10
 Through Through – 3:01
 This Never Stops – 3:53
 Gone to Seed – 1:31
 Will of Your Heart – 2:42
 Rested – 3:59
 Ways to Walk – 3:13
 True to a Lie – 3:44
 Now – 8:03

Reception 
Stewart Mason of AllMusic called it "1970s-style singer/songwriter mopery" similar to Joni Mitchell's Blue and Nick Drake's Pink Moon.  Mason wrote that it "isn't always an easy listen" but recommended it to fans of "sensitive-guy pop". Brent Hagerman of Exclaim! wrote that Gamble's "emotional quagmire [makes] for good listening" without being self-indulgent. Writing in CMJ New Music Monthly, Rob O'Connor called it a "stunning solo acoustic album" that shows that he is a "top-shelf sing-songwriter" despite his history of supporting roles in the industry.

References 

2002 albums